Sunlight Tower (formerly called MLC Tower or CEF Life Tower ) is a 40-storey skyscraper located at 248 Queen's Road East, in the Wan Chai district of Hong Kong. Designed by Andrew Lee King Fun & Associates, it was completed in 1998.

The building is managed by Henderson Sunlight Asset Management, a subsidiary of Henderson Land Development Hong Kong, a company which also developed the International Finance center.

The MLC in the name stands for Mutual Life & Citizens Assurance Company - an Australian life insurance company formed in 1908. The building was renamed CEF Life tower when, in 1998, six floors of the building were leased out to CEF Life (Canadian Eastern Life assurance, renamed CEF Lend Lease, now owned by Axa Hong Kong), a company partly owned by Lee Ka Shing's Cheung Kong holdings.

References

External links 

 Sunlight Reit - Official website
 Henderson Land - Official website

Office buildings completed in 1998
Queen's Road East
Skyscraper office buildings in Hong Kong
Wan Chai